The Magic School Bus is an animated educational children's television series, based on the book series of the same name by Joanna Cole and Bruce Degen. Running originally from 1994 to 1997, the series received critical acclaim for its use of celebrity voice talent and combining entertainment with an educational series. The show features famous actress and celebrity Lily Tomlin as the voice of Ms. Frizzle. The show's theme song is performed by famous singer Little Richard.

Plot
Miss Frizzle embarks on adventures with her class on the eponymous school bus. As they journey on their exciting field trips, they discover locations, creatures, time periods and more to learn about the wonders of science along the way.

Voice cast

 Lily Tomlin as Miss Frizzle
 Amos Crawley (season 1) and Daniel Tamberelli (season 2–4) as Arnold Perlstein
 Daniel DeSanto as Carlos Ramon
 Tara Meyer as Dorothy Ann Hudson
 Erica Luttrell as Keesha Franklin
 Maia Filar as Phoebe Terese
 Stuart Stone as Ralphie Tennelli
 Max Beckford (season 1) and Andre Ottley-Lorant (season 2–4) as Tim Wright
 Lisa Yamanaka as Wanda Li
 Malcolm-Jamal Warner as the male producer
 Susan Blu as the female producer
 Elliott Gould as Mr. Perlstein
 Renessa Blitz as Janet Perlstein
 Edward James Olmos as Mr. Ramon
 Kevin Zegers as Mikey Ramon
 Swoosie Kurtz as Mrs. Hudson
 Eartha Kitt as Mrs. Franklin
 Dana Elcar as Mr. Tennelli and Mr. Terese
 Paul Winfield as Principal Ruhle
 Tyne Daly as Dr. Tennelli
 Brian Keith as Brian Tennelli
 Rosalind Chao as Mrs. Li
 Dolly Parton as Katrina Eloise "Murph" Murphy
 Tony Randall as R.U. Humerus
 Rita Moreno as Dr. Carmina Skeledon
 Sherman Hemsley as Mr. Junkett
 Michael York as Harry Herp

Episodes

Production
In early 1994, The Magic School Bus concept was made into an animated series of the same name by Scholastic Entertainment and it premiered on September 10, 1994. The idea for the TV series was developed by former Scholastic Entertainment Vice President and Senior Editorial Director Craig Walker. Scholastic Entertainment president Deborah Forte explained that adapting the books into an animated series was an opportunity to help kids "learn about science in a fun way". During this time, Forte had been hearing concerns from parents and teachers about how to improve science education for kids and minorities across the globe. Hanho Heung-Up Co., Ltd. contributed some of the animation for this series. The theme song, called "Ride on the Magic School Bus", was written by Peter Lurye and performed by Little Richard. The voice director was Susan Blu; two of the writers for the series were Brian Meehl and Jocelyn Stevenson.

Broadcast
In the United States, from 1994 until 1997, the original run of The Magic School Bus was broadcast on PBS, as part of its daytime children's block. It was the first fully animated series to be aired on PBS. The last episode aired on December 6, 1997. By the series' end, it was among the highest-rated PBS shows for school-age children. After the final episode, the show was subsequently rerun intermittently on the lineup until September 25, 1998. On September 26, 1998, PBS dropped the show from its lineup in order to make room for more programs aimed at preschoolers. Later that year, Fox network acquired the original TV series and broadcast the show on the Fox Kids block as a weekday offering to fill educational television mandates for Fox affiliates. Fox Kids aired repeats of the show from 1998 to 2002.

After the original PBS run and Fox Kids reruns, TLC and Discovery Kids picked up the series. TLC aired it from February 24, 2003 until 2008 while Discovery Kids aired it from 2004 until 2009, as part of the Ready Set Learn block. 

On September 27, 2010, The Magic School Bus moved networks once again. It was broadcast through a daily run on Qubo as well as NBC's Saturday morning Qubo block. Reruns continued on both Qubo and NBC until 2012.

In Canada, the original TV series aired on CBC Kids (from 2000 until 2003), Teletoon, and Knowledge Network. In the United Kingdom, it aired on Channel 4 (Children Planet Programmes Block ) and Nickelodeon. Since 2005, Canada-based studio Nelvana acquired the TV series and sold it to the Latin American versions of  Cartoon Network and Nickelodeon. As of 2021, the show is currently distributed by 9 Story Media Group.

The opening theme song was notably shortened during the show's airings on Fox Kids and Qubo. The airings on PBS, TLC, Discovery Kids, and CBC Kids, along with the VHS and DVD versions, all used the full version of the opening.

Home media
The series (through home media) was released on VHS from 1995 to 2003, DVD from 2002 to 2013, DVD (by New Video Group) in Region 1 (which are the rereleases of the Warner Home Video DVDs) on July, 31, 2012, and Netflix on August 15, 2013. 

The series was originally released on VHS. The series on VHS was distributed by  KidVision (a division of WarnerVision Entertainment) between 1995 and 2003. On DVD, it was distributed by Warner Home Video (through Warner Bros. Family Entertainment and WarnerVision Entertainment) between 2002 and 2013. 

On July 31, 2012, New Video Group released the complete series on DVD in Region 1, as well as rereleases of the Warner Home Video DVDs.

On August 15, 2013, Scholastic announced the complete series' availability on Netflix. Currently however only season 1 of the series is available to stream on Netflix.

Reception

Critical response
In a 2007 column for the online edition of The Wall Street Journal, Jason Fry expressed an overall appreciation for the series, but wrote that the episode "The Magic School Bus Gets Programmed" illustrated the rapid pace of technological change over the ten years since it first aired. He explained the episode presented an old-fashioned "technology-gone-amok" story about the respective roles of programmer and machine that was no longer relevant to children growing up in 2007. He suggested that an updated version of the episode would have focused instead on the perils of Internet searches and on network concepts surfacing at the time.

Awards and nominations

Games

Numerous computer and video games associated with the series were released from 1994 to 2000, and were typically amalgamations of storylines from both the original book series and the television show.  The games were published by Microsoft Home.

A video game titled The Magic School Bus: Oceans was released for Nintendo DS on October 25, 2011, ten years after the release of the last game. This is the only game to be released on a Nintendo platform.

Revival series

On June 10, 2014, a new series was announced by Netflix and Scholastic Media titled The Magic School Bus 360°. The new iteration of the franchise features a modernized Ms. Frizzle and high-tech bus that stresses modern inventions such as robotics, wearables and camera technology. The producers hoped to captivate children's imaginations and motivate their interest in the sciences. 9 Story Media Group would produce the series. Producer Stuart Stone, who voiced Ralphie in the original series, explained that The Magic School Bus 360° will feature some of the original voice actors in different roles. The series' voice cast is based in Los Angeles and Toronto with Susan Blu as the Los Angeles voice director and Alyson Court as the Toronto voice director.

In February 2017, Netflix announced that Saturday Night Live cast member Kate McKinnon was cast in the role of Fiona Felicity Frizzle, the younger sister of Ms. Frizzle, now Professor Frizzle, again voiced by Lily Tomlin. By this point the title of the series had been changed to The Magic School Bus Rides Again. Lin-Manuel Miranda performed the theme song. On September 29, 2017 the series premiered on Netflix.

Film
On June 25, 2020, a film adaptation was announced and Elizabeth Banks is cast to play Ms. Frizzle.

References

External links

 
 
 
 
 The Magic School Bus at Netflix

The Magic School Bus
1990s American animated television series
1990s American comic science fiction television series
1994 American television series debuts
1997 American television series endings
1990s Canadian animated television series
1990s Canadian comic science fiction television series
1994 Canadian television series debuts
1997 Canadian television series endings
American children's animated adventure television series
American children's animated comic science fiction television series
American children's animated education television series
American children's animated science fantasy television series
American television shows based on children's books
American children's animated comedy television series
Canadian children's animated adventure television series
Canadian children's animated comic science fiction television series
Canadian children's animated education television series
Canadian children's animated science fantasy television series
Canadian television shows based on children's books
Canadian children's animated comedy television series
Buses in fiction
English-language television shows
PBS Kids shows
PBS original programming
Fox Broadcasting Company original programming
Fox Kids
South Carolina Educational Television
Science education television series
Television series about educators
Television series by Nelvana
Television series by 9 Story Media Group
Television series about size change
Television series about shapeshifting
Animated television series about children
Animated television series about animals
Elementary school television series